The 2018 İstanbul Cup (also known as the TEB BNP Paribas İstanbul Cup for sponsorship reasons) was a tennis tournament played on outdoor clay courts. It was the 11th edition of the İstanbul Cup, and part of the WTA International tournaments of the 2018 WTA Tour. It took place in Istanbul, Turkey, from 23 through 29 April 2018.

Points and prize money

Prize money

Singles main-draw entrants

Seeds

 Rankings are as of April 16, 2018.

Other entrants
The following players received wildcards into the singles main draw:
  Ayla Aksu
  Çağla Büyükakçay
  İpek Öz

The following players received entry from the qualifying draw:
  Valentyna Ivakhnenko 
  Dalila Jakupović 
  Anna Kalinskaya 
  Danka Kovinić
  Arantxa Rus
  Viktoriya Tomova

Withdrawals 
  Beatriz Haddad Maia → replaced by  Christina McHale
  Kateryna Kozlova → replaced by  Ajla Tomljanović
  Tatjana Maria → replaced by  Sara Errani
  Naomi Osaka → replaced by  Polona Hercog

Retirements 
  Kateryna Bondarenko
  Agnieszka Radwańska
  Caroline Wozniacki

Doubles main-draw entrants

Seeds 

 1 Rankings as of April 16, 2018.

Other entrants 
The following pairs received wildcards into the doubles main draw:
  Ayla Aksu /  Harriet Dart
  İpek Öz /  Melis Sezer

Withdrawals 
During the tournament
  Kateryna Bondarenko

Champions

Singles

  Pauline Parmentier def.  Polona Hercog, 6–4, 3–6, 6–3

Doubles

  Liang Chen /  Zhang Shuai def.  Xenia Knoll /  Anna Smith, 6–4, 6–4

References

External links
 Official website
 Players list

2018 in Istanbul
2018 in Turkish tennis
Istanbul Cup
İstanbul Cup
İstanbul Cup